The 2009 Shanghai ATP Masters 1000 (also known as the 2009 Shanghai ATP Masters 1000–presented by Rolex) was a tennis tournament played on outdoor hard courts. It was the 1st edition of the Shanghai ATP Masters 1000, and was classified as an ATP World Tour Masters 1000 event on the 2009 ATP World Tour. It was played at Qizhong Forest Sports City Arena in Shanghai, China. The tournament replaced Madrid as the second and last ATP World Tour Masters 1000 tournament where it was now moved into a spring calendar, the inaugural edition was held from October 11 to October 18, 2009.

The singles field was led by Rafael Nadal. Other top seeds were 2008 Australian Open champion Novak Djokovic, reigning US Open champion Juan Martín del Potro and Wimbledon finalist Andy Roddick.

World No. 1 Roger Federer had been due to play but withdrew, citing fatigue. World No. 3 Andy Murray was also scheduled to play, but withdrew due to a wrist injury.

ATP entrants

Seeds

 seeds are based on the rankings of October 5, 2009

Other entrants
The following players received wildcards into the singles main draw:
  Gong Maoxin
  Ernests Gulbis
  Marat Safin
  Zeng Shao-Xuan

The following players received entry from the qualifying draw:
  Thomaz Bellucci
  Marco Chiudinelli
  Fabio Fognini
  Łukasz Kubot
  Michaël Llodra
  Florian Mayer 
  Rainer Schüttler

Finals

Singles

 Nikolay Davydenko defeated  Rafael Nadal, 7–6(7–3), 6–3 
 It was Davydenko's 4th title of the year and the 18th of his career.
 It was Davydenko's 3rd Masters title and improving his perfect Masters finals to 3–0.

Doubles

 Julien Benneteau /  Jo-Wilfried Tsonga defeated  Mariusz Fyrstenberg /  Marcin Matkowski, 6–2, 6–4.

References

External links
Official Website

 
Shanghai ATP Masters 1000
Shanghai Masters (tennis)
Shanghai ATP Masters 1000
Shanghai ATP Masters 1000